Mount Gardner is a mountain that is part of the Sentinel Range, in the Ellsworth Mountains of Antarctica Antarctica. It may also refer to:

Mount Gardner (Bowen Island), on Bowen Island in British Columbia, Canada

Mount Gardner (Western Australia), in Two Peoples Bay Nature Reserve, Western Australia

See also
Mount Gardiner (disambiguation)